The 1962 Cincinnati Reds season was a season in American baseball the team finished in third place in the National League standings, with a record of 98–64, 3½ games behind the NL Champion San Francisco Giants. The Reds were managed by Fred Hutchinson, and played their home games at Crosley Field.

The Reds entered the season as the defending NL Champions, having won the '61 pennant by 4 games over the second-place Dodgers. The Reds' lineup returned intact, although sophomore Leo Cárdenas was set to replace veteran Eddie Kasko at shortstop, putting the versatile Kasko in a "super-sub" role. That all changed in spring training when slugging third-baseman Gene Freese broke his ankle during an intra-squad game and missed virtually the entire season. The light-hitting Kasko was moved to third base and played well, but the Reds sorely missed the 26 home runs and 87 RBI that Freese had provided the year before. The lack of Freese's big bat severely hurt the Reds' chances to repeat as National League champions.

The Dodgers and Giants dominated the National League most of the year, with the Reds a distant third. Aided by two expansion teams (the Houston Colt .45s and the New York Mets), the top NL teams were winning at a very high rate. By June 6, Giants were 40-16 (.714) and the Dodgers 40-17 (.702). The Reds were playing solid baseball themselves (29-20, .592), but still trailed the Giants by 7½ games and the Dodgers by 7. Cincinnati stayed a relatively distant third for most of the season until a 9-game winning streak Aug. 5-13 drew the Reds to within 6½ games of the Dodgers and to within 4 games of the Giants. By Aug. 25, the Reds had crept to within 3 games of the Dodgers and 3½ games of the Giants, thanks to a 6-game winning streak.

The Reds had made up ground on both the Giants and the Dodgers, who had finally started to fade. Los Angeles lost star pitcher Sandy Koufax to a finger injury on July 17 against the Reds. The lefty missed 58 games and approximately 13 to 14 starts before returning in September. The Giants came to Crosley Field to play a 2-game set with the Reds Sept. 12–13, the last time the Giants and Reds would meet. The Reds won both games to pull to within 3 games of the Giants and Dodgers with 13 games to go. With first place within reach, the Reds went on a crucial 9-game road trip to New York, Philadelphia and Pittsburgh, but won just 3 of 9 games, going 1–2 in each city. Meanwhile, the Giants also initially stumbled down the stretch. After leaving Cincinnati, the Giants went to Pittsburgh and promptly got swept in a 4-game series at Forbes Field, which marked 6-straight losses. San Francisco righted the ship and won 7 of its last 11 to tie the Dodgers at 101-61 while the Reds were three games back. In a 3-game "playoff" series where the statistics counted for the regular season, San Francisco beat Los Angeles 2 games to 1 to win the right to face the New York Yankees in the 1962 World Series.

The Reds finished with virtually the same winning percentage (.605) as the one (.604) that was good enough to win the NL pennant in 1961. Reds right fielder Frank Robinson followed up his '61 MVP season with another monster year at the plate, slugging 39 home runs (3rd in the NL), 136 RBI (3rd in the NL), and his .342 batting average was just .004 behind the Dodgers' Tommy Davis in a race for the batting crown. Robinson also led the league with 134 runs scored and a 1.045 OPS, while he was second in the Senior Circuit with 208 hits and 380 total bases. Robinson finished fourth in the NL MVP voting behind Maury Wills, Willie Mays and Davis.

Bob Purkey emerged as the Reds' staff ace with a career year, compiling a 23–5 record while pitching 288.1 innings. Purkey was third in the NL Cy Young Award voting behind the Dodgers' Don Drysdale and San Francisco's Jack Sanford. Purkey also finished eighth in the NL MVP voting.

Offseason 
 October 10, 1961: Outfielder Gus Bell was drafted from the Reds by the New York Mets in the 1961 MLB expansion draft.
 December 14, 1961: Pitcher Marshall Bridges was traded by the Reds to the New York Yankees for catcher Jesse Gonder.
 December 15, 1961: Pitcher Dave Stenhouse and catcher Bob Schmidt were traded by the Reds to the Washington Senators for outfielder Marty Keough and pitcher Johnny Klippstein.

Regular season

Season standings

Record vs. opponents

Notable transactions 
 May 7, 1962: Bob Miller and Cliff Cook were traded by the Reds to the New York Mets for Don Zimmer.

Roster

Player stats

Batting

Starters by position 
Note: Pos = Position; G = Games played; AB = At bats; H = Hits; Avg. = Batting average; HR = Home runs; RBI = Runs batted in

Reserves 
Note: G = Games played; AB = At bats; H = Hits; Avg. = Batting average; HR = Home runs; RBI = Runs batted in

Pitching

Starting pitchers 
Note: G = Games pitched; IP = Innings pitched; W = Wins; L = Losses; ERA = Earned run average; SO = Strikeouts

Other pitchers 
Note: G = Games pitched; IP = Innings pitched; W = Wins; L = Losses; ERA = Earned run average; SO = Strikeouts

Relief pitchers 
Note: G = Games pitched; W = Wins; L = Losses; SV = Saves; ERA = Earned run average; SO = Strikeouts

Farm system 

LEAGUE CHAMPIONS: San Diego, Macon

References

External links 
1962 Cincinnati Reds season at Baseball Reference

 

Cincinnati Reds seasons
Cincinnati Reds season
Cincinnati Reds